"Rumors Are Flying" is a 1946 popular song popularized by Frankie Carle and Les Paul and The Andrews Sisters.

Background

The song was written by Bennie Benjamin and George David Weiss and published in 1946.
 
It was popularized in 1946 by Frankie Carle (vocal by Marjorie Hughes) and by The Andrews Sisters with Les Paul. The Frankie Carle version was a number-one hit in  1946 in America for nine weeks from late October that year.

Other recordings
Other charted versions in 1946 were by Betty Jane Rhodes; Billy Butterfield; The Three Suns; Tony Martin; and by Harry Cool and his Orchestra (vocal by Mindy Carson) (who recorded the song for Signature Records, catalog #15043.)

References

Sources
Nimmo, H. Arlo. The Andrews Sisters. Jefferson: McFarland & Co, Inc., 2004.
Sforza, John. Swing It! The Andrews Sisters Story. Lexington: The University Press of Kentucky, 2000.
Shaughnessy, Mary Alice. Les Paul: An American Original. New York: W. Morrow, 1993.

1946 songs
1946 singles
Songs written by Bennie Benjamin
Songs written by George David Weiss
Number-one singles in the United States